A list of the films produced in Mexico in 1963 (see 1963 in film):

1963

External links

1963
Films
Mexican